Édouard Fournier (15 June 1819, Orléans – 10 May 1880, Paris) was a 19th-century French homme de lettres, playwright, historian, bibliographer and librarian.

Biography 

Born into a locksmiths artist family, he studied at the Collège d'Orléans then devoted entirely to literary work. After a first play in 1841, and some feuilletons published in the newspaper Le Loiret in 1842, he published a large number of historical, literary, literature and theater studies. He published numerous authors while continuing to write for the stage. He also contributed a great number of articles to the Encyclopédie universelle, the Supplément du Dictionnaire de la conversation, the Historie des villes de France, Le Moniteur universel, Le Constitutionnel, L'Illustration, La Revue française, Le Théâtre, whose chief editor he was from 1853 to 1855, La Patrie, where he held a Parisian theatrical chronicle from 1856, then theatrical, the Revue des provinces, of which he was director from 1863 to 1866. In 1872, he was appointed a librarian at the Interior Ministry.

Main publications 

1847:Souvenirs historiques et littéraires du Loiret 
1847:La Musique chez le peuple ou l'Opéra-national, son passé et son avenir sur le boulevard du Temple, with Louis-Adolphe Le Doulcet de Pontécoulant
1849:Essai sur l'art lyrique au théâtre, depuis les anciens jusqu'à Meyerbeer, with Léon Kreutzer
1849:Essai historique sur l'orthographe
1851: Histoire des hôtelleries, cabarets, hôtels garnis, restaurants et cafés, et des anciennes communautés et confreries d'hôteliers, de marchands de vins, de restaurateurs, de limonadiers, etc., with Francisque Michel Text online 1 2
1851: Un prétendant portugais au XVIe siècle, lettre à M. M. D'Antas, sur Don Antonio, prieur de Crato, suivie d'études sur un prédicateur portugais à Paris en 1610, la Rosalinda et l'origine portugaise de la Fiancée du roi de Garbe 
1852: Histoire de l'imprimerie et des arts et professions qui se rattachent à la typographie, comprenant l'histoire des anciennes corporations et confréries depuis leur fondation jusqu'à leur suppression en 1789, with Paul Lacroix and Ferdinand Seré
1853: Paris démoli, mosaïque de ruines
1854: Les Lanternes. Histoire de l'ancien éclairage de Paris, suivi de la réimpression de quelques poèmes rares : Les Nouvelles Lanternes, 1755 [by Valois d'Orville] ; Plaintes des filoux et écumeurs de bourses contre nosseigneurs les réverbères, 1769 ; Les Ambulantes à la brune contre la dureté du temps, 1769 ; Les Sultanes nocturnes, 1769
1854: Antoine Furetière. Le Roman bourgeois, ouvrage comique Text online
1855: Les Caquets de l'accouchée, anonymous account of 1622 
1854: Chansons de Gaultier Garguille 
1855: Curiosités des inventions et découvertes
1855: Curiosités militaires,
1855: L'Esprit des autres, Text online
1855–1863: Variétés historiques et littéraires, recueil de pièces volantes rares et curieuses en prose et en vers (10 volumes)
1856: Lettres inédites de la marquise de Créqui à Sénac de Meilhan, 1782-1789, mises en ordre et annotées by Édouard Fournier, preceded by an introduction by Sainte-Beuve
1856: Marie-Catherine-Hortense de Villedieu. Récit en vers et en prose de la farce des Précieuses
1856: L'Esprit dans l'histoire, recherches et curiosités sur les mots historiques, bnam  CNAM Gallica Text online
1857: Alexis Piron. Œuvres 
1858: Histoire physique, civile et morale de Paris par Jacques-Antoine Dulaure, augmentée d'une notice sur Dulaure et continuée jusqu'à nos jours par Édouard Fournier (3 volumes)
1859: Le Vieux-neuf, histoire ancienne des inventions et découvertes modernes (2 volumes)
1860: Énigmes des rues de Paris, text online
1862: Histoire du Pont-Neuf (2 volumes)
1862: Le Jeu de paume, son histoire et sa description, notice par M. Edouard Fournier, suivie d'un traité de la courte-paume et de la longue-paume, des biographies des principaux paumiers, etc.
1863: Le Roman de Molière, suivi de fragments sur sa vie privée, d'après des documents nouveaux, Text online
1864: L'Art de la reliure en France aux derniers siècles
1864: Chroniques et légendes des rues de Paris, Text online
1866: La Comédie de Jean de La Bruyère (2 volumes)
1867: Les Tragédies de Sophocles, texte grec avec un commentaire critique et explicatif
1871: Les Prussiens chez nous 
1871: Le Théâtre français au XVIe et au XVIIe siècle, ou Choix des comédies les plus curieuses antérieures à Molière, avec une introduction, des notes et une notice sur chaque auteur
1873: Œuvres complètes de Nicolas Boileau, précédées de la vie de l'auteur d'après des documents nouveaux et inédits
1874: Voltaire. Théâtre complet 
1875: Œuvres complètes de Regnard, précédée d'une introduction d'après des documents entièrement nouveaux
1876: Œuvres complètes de Beaumarchais 
1876: Œuvres de Jean de La Fontaine : théâtre, fables, poésies, etc.
1877: Œuvres de Marivaux. Théâtre complet  
1877: Histoire de la butte des Moulins, suivie d'une étude historique sur les demeures de Corneille à Paris 
1878: Le Livre commode des adresses de Paris pour 1692 par Nicolas de Blégny, précédé d'une introduction et annoté par Édouard Fournier (2 volumes) Text online 1 2
1879: Scarron. Théâtre complet
1879: Le Mystère de Robert le Diable, mis en deux parties, avec transcription en vers modernes en regard du texte du XIVe siècle, et précédé d'une introduction par Édouard Fournier 
1880: Souvenirs poétiques de l'école romantique, 1825 à 1840, Text online
1881: Théâtre choisi de Louis-Benoît Picard  
1881: Paris-Capitale
1883: Paris démoli (Nouvelle édition revue et augmentée) 
1884: Histoire des enseignes de Paris, revue et publiée par Paul Lacroix
1885: Études sur la vie et les œuvres de Molière, revues et mises en ordre par Paul Lacroix Text online
1889: Histoire des jouets et des jeux d'enfants 
 Une Malouine au temps de la Révolution. Madame de Bassablons d'après les documents de l'époque (4th edition, 1922)
Theatre
1841: La Fête des fous, five-act drama, with Auguste Arnould, Paris, Théâtre de la Renaissance, 6 February
1851: Christian et Marguerite, one-act comedy, in verse, with Pol Mercier, Paris, Comédie-Française, 6 March
1853: Le Roman du village, one-act comedy in verse, with Pol Mercier, Paris, Théâtre de l'Odéon, 5 June
1854: Les Deux Épagneuls, one-act opéra comique in free verse, music by Charles Manry, Paris, Néo-Thermes, 19 December
1856: Le Chapeau du roi, one-act opéra comique, music by Henri Caspers, Paris, Théâtre-Lyrique, 16 April
1858: La Charmeuse, one-act opéra comique, music by Henri Caspers, Paris, Théâtre des Bouffes-Parisiens, 12 April
1859: Le Diable rose, one-act play with ariettes, with Pol Mercier, music by Hermine Déjazet, Paris, Théâtre Déjazet, 14 November
1860: Titus et Bérénice, opérette bouffe in 1 act, music by Léon Gastinel, Paris, Théâtre des Bouffes-Parisiens, 12 May
1862: Corneille à la butte Saint-Roch, one-act comedy, in verse, Paris, Théâtre-Français, 6 June
1862: Le Paradis trouvé, one-act comedy, in verse, with Pol Mercier, Paris, Théâtre de l'Odéon, 1 September
1863: La Fille de Molière, one-act comedy, in verse, Paris, Théâtre de l'Odéon, 15 January Text online
1864: Racine à Uzès, one-act comedy, in verse, Paris, Théâtre du Vaudeville, 21 December
1868: La Valise de Molière, one-act comedy, in prose, Paris, Théâtre-Français, 15 January
1869: Gutenberg, drama in 5 acts and in verse, Paris, Théâtre de l'Odéon, 8 April
1872: La Vraie Farce de Maître Pathelin, mise en 3 actes et en vers modernes, Paris, Comédie-Française, 26 November

Sources 
Pierre Larousse, Grand Dictionnaire universel du XIXe siècle, vol. VIII, 1872, (p. 682–683).
Gustave Vapereau, Dictionnaire universel des contemporains, vol. I, 1858, (p. 688).
Adolphe Bitard, Dictionnaire général de biographie contemporaine française et étrangère, 1878, (p. 482–483).

External links 
 Édouard Fournier on data.bnf.fr

19th-century French dramatists and playwrights
19th-century French historians
French bibliographers
French librarians
Writers from Orléans
1819 births
1880 deaths